The Guides and Scouts of Norway is the national Scouting and Guiding federation of Norway, founded in 2003. It took over the WOSM membership of Norges Speiderforbund and the WAGGGS membership of the Fellesrådet for speiderpiker i Norge. Speidernes Fellesorganisasjon serves 17,348 Scouts (as of 2011) and 14,443 Guides (as of 2008).

The federation has actual two independent member associations:
Norges Speiderforbund (Norwegian Guide and Scout Association)
Norges KFUK-KFUM-speidere (YWCA-YMCA Guides and Scouts of Norway)

References

External links
Official website  

World Association of Girl Guides and Girl Scouts member organizations
World Organization of the Scout Movement member organizations
Scouting and Guiding in Norway
Organizations established in 2003
2003 establishments in Norway